The 1969 Cornell Big Red football team was an American football team that represented Cornell University during the 1969 NCAA University Division football season. Cornell finished fourth in the Ivy League . 

In its second season under head coach Jack Musick, the team compiled a 4–5 record and was outscored 162 to 148. Theo Jacobs and Dennis Huff were the team captains. 

Cornell's 4–3 conference record placed fourth in the Ivy League standings. The Big Red outscored Ivy opponents 127 to 113. 

Cornell played its home games at Schoellkopf Field in Ithaca, New York.

Schedule

References

Cornell
Cornell Big Red football seasons
Cornell Big Red football